Swami Shree Haridas Ji is a Hindu spiritual leader from Kathmandu, Nepal. He was awarded the title of "Swami" on October 1, 2008, by Jagadguru Shri Kripalu Maharaj. Since then, he has been preaching the spiritual knowledge of the Vedas, Upanishads, Bhagavad Gita, Puranas, Shrimad Bhagavata, Ramayana, Vedant, other Eastern and Western philosophies across Nepal. He also preaches in the United States, United Kingdom, Canada, and India.

Philosophy
He believes that there is harmony among different scriptures such as the Vedas, Quran, Bible, and Tripiṭaka. Despite this, there are clear contrasting opinions. He uses these scriptures to impart knowledge to people through his speeches. According to him, love is the only way to realize God. Rather than focusing on the theoretical aspect of scriptures, he emphasizes the practical aspect of scriptures, such as the loving meditation of God in the modern age.

Establishment of organizations
He has established over six Satsang centers (congregation center) in different parts of the United States such as Dallas, Chesapeake, Virginia, Chicago, Minnesota, Colorado, and Washington, D.C. He has also established several Satsang centres in different parts of Nepal such as in the Butwal, Birtamod, Banepa, Baglung District, Damak, Damauli, Dharan, Nepal, Ghorahi, Gaighat, Nepal, Gulmi District, Illam, Lamjung District, Pokhara, Palpa District, and Syangja District. Similar functions are organized in Divine Club of London which is established in london, United Kingdom.

Divine Youth Club Nepal founded by Swamiji organizes various Mediation Camps from time to time to encourage youths towards spirituality and social works. He has also motivated youths from America and Europe in preservation of cultural and spiritual values .

Divine Club Worldwide  which is also founded by him which headquarter is in USA also actively participates on blood drives, food drives etc. A temple of worth 1 billion to be  constructed by Shree Radha Madhav Samiti Nepal in  Hetauda has been started from July 2017

Philanthropic activities
Swami has been involved in different social works.
 Distribution of Assistive devices and necessary equipments to differently abled people
 Distribution of Blanket, Cap along with money and food to poor and needy people 
 White Cane, Slate teller distribution to blind people
 Handing over Hearse and Stretcher to Pasupati Development TrustDistribution of needs, such as wheelchairs and hearing aids to needy people
 Involved in Environment Cleaning Program
 Organized different blood donation, eye donation and free dental checkup campaign

Most popular lectures
Some of the popular lecture series of Swami Shree Haridas Ji include Mystery of Life and Death, Vedavyas evam Prannit Siddhanta, and Ramnavami Speech.

References

External links

Hindu spiritual teachers
New Age spiritual leaders
Year of birth missing (living people)
Living people